is a 1998 Japanese psychological supernatural horror film directed by Hideo Nakata, based on the 1991 novel by Koji Suzuki. The film stars Nanako Matsushima, Miki Nakatani and Hiroyuki Sanada, and follows a reporter who is racing to investigate the mystery behind a cursed video tape; whoever watches the tape dies seven days after doing so. The film is titled The Ring (stylized as the Ring) in English in Japan and released as Ringu in North America.

Production took approximately nine months. Ring and its sequel Spiral were released in Japan at the same time. After its release, Ring was a huge box office success in Japan and was acclaimed by critics. It inspired numerous follow-ups in the Ring franchise, popularized Japanese horror (or "J-horror") internationally, and triggered a trend of Western remakes of J-horror films, including the 2002 American film The Ring.

Plot
During a sleepover, high schoolers Tomoko and Masami discuss an urban legend about a video tape that curses its viewers to die in seven days after a foreboding phone call. Tomoko then confesses that last week she and her friends watched a strange video tape and received an inexplicable phone call afterwards. They receive a false alarm phone call, then Masami goes to the toilet. Tomoko witnesses the TV turn on by itself and is killed by an unseen presence.

Tomoko's aunt, journalist Reiko Asakawa, investigates this legend and learns during Tomoko's funeral that the three friends who watched the tape with Tomoko died at the same time as her. Reiko visits Izu Pacific Land Resort, where the four friends were staying, and discovers an unmarked video tape. It contains brief, seemingly unrelated scenes accompanied by screeching sounds, and ends with a shot of a well. After watching, Reiko sees an apparition and receives a phone call that emits the screeching sounds from the tape.

Convinced that she has been cursed, Reiko enlists the help of her psychic ex-husband Ryūji Takayama. Ryūji watches the tape despite Reiko's concerns and agrees to help her. Dissecting a copy of the tape Reiko made, the pair find a cryptic message spoken in an Ōshima dialect. Before departing to Ōshima, Reiko catches her and Ryūji’s seven-year-old son Yōichi watching the tape after being told to do so by "Tomoko". In Ōshima, Reiko and Ryūji learn about Shizuko Yamamura, who, prior to her suicide, gained notoriety following a public demonstration of her psychic ability organised by ESP researcher Dr Heihachiro Ikuma, with whom she had an affair. When confronting Takashi, Shizuko's brother who extorted her, the pair learn through a vision that, during the demonstration, Shizuko's young daughter Sadako psychically killed a journalist who decried Shizuko's abilities. After failing to track down Sadako, Reiko realises that Ryūji never received a phone call after watching the tape as she did at the cabin in Izu. After a boat ride back to the mainland provided by Takashi, the pair rush to the cabin to investigate.

Reiko and Ryūji find a sealed well in the cabin's crawlspace and, through another vision, learn that Dr Ikuma bludgeoned Sadako, pushed her into this well, and trapped her inside. They conclude that Sadako remained alive and that the curse was born when a video tape "recorded" the rage she had projected. When draining the water, they find Sadako's remains, and, since Reiko does not die despite having passed her deadline, believe the curse is broken.

The next day, Ryūji finds his TV turn on by itself, showing the well at the end of the video tape. Sadako's vengeful spirit staggers from the well and out of the TV, advancing toward him and frightening him to death. Reiko, who had been trying to call Ryūji at the time, hears his last moments over the phone. Guided by an apparition, she deduces the actual way to break the curse: copying the tape and showing it to someone else within seven days, effectively letting the curse spread. Reiko realises that while she did this, Ryūji did not. Desperate to save Yōichi, Reiko drives to her father's home to show him the tape.

Cast
 Nanako Matsushima as Reiko Asakawa, a journalist who investigates her niece's death and finds the cursed video tape.
 Hiroyuki Sanada as Ryūji Takayama, Reiko's former husband, a former medical student turned university professor. He has a degree of sixth sense that detects supernatural auras.
 Rikiya Ōtaka as Yōichi Asakawa, Reiko's young son who also has a sixth sense like his father.
 Miki Nakatani as Mai Takano, Ryuji's student.
 Yuko Takeuchi as Tomoko Ōishi, Reiko's niece who watches the cursed video tape and is amongst its first victims.
 Hitomi Sato as Masami Kurahashi, Tomoko's best friend.
 Daisuke Ban as Dr. Heihachiro Ikuma, Sadako's father who threw her down a well.
 Rie Inō as Sadako Yamamura, a young woman with psychic powers who was thrown down a well where she died; her spirit lived on within a video tape.
 Masako as Shizuko Yamamura, Sadako's mother. She too had psychic powers but a disastrous press demonstration led to her suicide.
 Yōichi Numata as Takashi Yamamura, Sadako's uncle who runs an inn on Oshima Island.
 Yutaka Matsushige as Yoshino, a journalist associate of Reiko.
 Katsumi Muramatsu as Kōichi Asakawa, Reiko's father.

Themes and interpretations
Critics have discussed Rings preoccupations with Japanese tradition's collision with modernity. Colette Balmain identifies: "In the figure of Sadako, Ring [utilises the] vengeful yūrei archetype of conventional Japanese horror". She argues how this traditional Japanese figure is expressed via a video tape which "embodies contemporary anxieties, in that it is technology through which the repressed past reasserts itself".

Ruth Goldberg argues that Ring expresses "ambivalence about motherhood". She reads Reiko as a mother who – due to the new potential for women's independence – neglects her "natural" role as martyred homemaker in pursuit of an independent identity, subsequently neglecting her child. Goldberg identifies a doubling effect whereby the unconscious conflicts of Reiko's family are expressed via the supernatural in the other family under Reiko's investigation.

Jay McRoy reads the ending hopefully: if the characters therapeutically understand their conflicts, they can live on. Balmain, however, is not optimistic; she reads the replication of the video as technology spreading, virus-like, throughout Japan.

Title
The film's title, Ring, can be interpreted in several ways, such as alluding to the never ending cyclical nature of the ring curse/virus. Another interpretation is that "ring" relates to the phone call which warns those that view the video tape that they will die in seven days, as well as to the view of the ring of light seen from the bottom of the well where Sadako's body was left to decompose.

Production

After the moderate success of the 1991 novel Ring by Koji Suzuki, Kadokawa Shoten decided to adapt it into a motion picture.

Screenwriter Hiroshi Takahashi and director Hideo Nakata collaborated to work on the script after reading Suzuki's novel and watching Fuji Television's 1995 made-for-TV film, directed by Chisui Takigawa. The broadcast version of the 1995 film was re-edited and released on home video under a new title, Ring: Kanzenban ( "Ring: The Complete Edition"; Nakata did not state which version of it he and Takahashi watched.

In their film script, Takashi and Nakata changed the protagonist's gender (from male to female), name (from Kazuyuki Asakawa to Reiko Asakawa), marital status (from married to divorced) and child's gender and name (from daughter Yoko to son Yoichi).

With the budget of US$1.5 million, the entire production took nine months and one week. According to director Nakata, the script and pre-production process took three or four months, shooting five weeks and post-production four months.

The special effects on the cursed video tape and some parts in the film were shot on a 35 mm film which was passed on to a laboratory in which a computer added a "grainy" effect. Extended visual effects were used in the scene in which the ghost of Sadako Yamamura climbs out of the television. First, they shot the kabuki actress Rie Inoo walking backwards in a jerky, exaggerated motion. They then played the film in reverse to portray an unnatural-looking walk for Sadako.

Release
Ring was released in Japan on January 31, 1998 where it was distributed by Toho. Upon release in Japan, Ring became the highest-grossing horror film in the country. The film was shown at the 1999 Fantasia Film Festival where it won the first place award for Best Feature in the Asian films section.

In the Philippines, the film was given limited releases as Ring: Circle of Evil on both December 4, 2002, and January 11, 2003, to coincide with the North American remake's release on January 17.

Box office

Variety stated that Rings "most notable success" has been in Hong Kong, where it became the biggest grosser during the first half of the year, beating popular American films such as The Matrix. On its 1999 Hong Kong release, Ring earned  (US$4.03 million) during its two-month theatrical run making it Hong Kong's highest-grossing Japanese-language film. This record was later beaten by Stand By Me Doraemon in 2015. In Taiwan, where it released in 1999, the film grossed .

Home media
Ring was released directly to home video in the United States and Canada by DreamWorks with English, Spanish, and French subtitles on March 4, 2003, under the transliterated title Ringu.

In the United Kingdom, it was watched by 390,000 viewers on television during the first half of 2005, making it the sixth most-watched foreign-language film on UK television during that period. Ring 2 also drew 360,000 viewers on UK television during the same period, adding up to a combined 750,000 UK television viewership for both Ring films during the first half of 2005.

To coincide with its 20th anniversary, Arrow Films under their Arrow Video imprint issued a Blu-ray Disc of Ring on March 18, 2019 in the UK and Ireland. Additionally, a Blu-ray box set featuring Ring, the sequels Spiral and Ring 2, and prequel Ring 0, was also released. The transfer features a 4K resolution restoration that was scanned from the film's original camera negative. The picture grading and restoration, which took place at Imagica Labs in Tokyo, was supervised and approved by Ring cinematographer Jun'ichirō Hayashi. Both Arrow's single Blu-ray Disc and Blu-ray box set were later released in the United States and Canada on October 29, again under the transliterated title Ringu.

Reception

The review aggregator website Rotten Tomatoes gives the film an approval rating of 97% based on 38 reviews, with a weighted average of 7.5 out of 10. The site's critical consensus reads: "Ringu combines supernatural elements with anxieties about modern technology in a truly frightening and unnerving way".

Sight & Sound critic Mark Kermode praised the film's "timeless terror", with its "combination of old folk devils and contemporary moral panics" which appeal to both teen and adult audiences alike. While Adam Smith of Empire Online finds the film "throttled by its over complexity, duff plotting and a distinct lack of actual action", Kermode emphasizes that "one is inclined to conclude that it is the telling, rather than the content of the tale, that is all-important". Variety agrees that the slow pace, with "its gradual evocation of evil lying await beneath the surface of normality", is one of the film's biggest strengths. Ring was listed as the twelfth best horror film of all time by The Guardian and also picked by Stuart Heritage in the same paper as the film that frightened him most.

Ring was ranked No. 69 in Empire magazine's "The 100 Best Films of World Cinema" in 2010. In the early 2010s, Time Out conducted a poll with several authors, directors, actors and critics who have worked within the horror genre to vote for their top horror films. Ring placed at number 61 on their top 100 list.

Influence
Vortex, based on the Junji Ito horror manga of the same name).

Influence on Western cinema
Ring had some influence on Western cinema and gained cult status in the West.

Throughout the 1980s and 1990s, Hollywood horror had largely been dominated by the slasher sub-genre, which relied on on-screen violence, shock tactics, and gore. Ring, whose release in Japan roughly coincided with The Blair Witch Project in the United States, helped to revitalise the genre by taking a more restrained approach to horror, leaving much of the terror to the audience's imagination. The film initiated global interest in Japanese cinema in general and Japanese horror cinema in particular, a renaissance which led to the coining of the term J-Horror in the West. This "New Asian Horror" resulted in further successful releases, such as Ju-on: The Grudge and Dark Water. In addition to Japanese productions this boom also managed to bring attention to similar films made in East Asia at the same time such as A Tale of Two Sisters from South Korea and The Eye from Hong Kong.

All of these films were later remade in English. Released in 2002, The Ring reached number 1 at the box office and grossed slightly more in Japan than the original. The original Ring grossed  in 1998, while The Ring remake grossed  in 2002.

Sequels and remakes

The original sequel was Spiral, released in 1998, but due to its poor reception, a new sequel, Ring 2, was released in 1999 which continued the storyline of this film. It was followed by a 2000 prequel, Ring 0: Birthday, followed by Sadako in 2019. Spiral in turn was followed by Sadako 3D in 2012 and Sadako 3D 2 in 2013. Another installment, Sadako DX, was released in 2022.

A television series, Ring: The Final Chapter, was made, with a similar storyline but many changes in characters and their backstories. A South Korean remake The Ring Virus was made in 1999; as well as an American remake, The Ring, in 2002.

See also

 List of ghost films
 Don't Look Up (1996 film)
 Ju-On
 Yotsuya Kaidan

References

Works cited

External links
 
 
 
 Snowblood Apple's Ring Cycle article, an overview of all Ring films.

1998 films
1998 horror films
The Ring (franchise)
1990s Japanese-language films
1990s supernatural horror films
Films based on horror novels
1990s ghost films
1990s mystery thriller films‎
Japanese mystery horror films
Japanese supernatural horror films
Films based on Japanese novels
Films directed by Hideo Nakata
Films about curses
Films about psychic powers
Films scored by Kenji Kawai
Techno-horror films
Japanese ghost films
Filicide in fiction
1990s Japanese films